Agrilus australasiae  is a species of beetle in the family Buprestidae, the jewel beetles, native to Australia.

References

hypoleucus
Beetles described in 1837